Trimeresurus albolabris, the white-lipped pit viper or white-lipped tree viper, is a venomous pit viper species endemic to Southeast Asia.

Taxonomy
Giannasi et al. (2001) raised insularis and septentrionalis to species level. Malhotra & Thorpe (2004) transferred this species (and a number of others) to the genus Cryptelytrops. David et al. (2011) returned it to the genus Trimeresurus and assigned it the subgenus Trimeresurus, creating the new combination Trimeresurus (Trimeresurus) albolabris.

Common names include green tree pit viper, white-lipped pit viper, white-lipped tree viper, white-lipped green pit viper and white-lipped bamboo pit viper.

Description
Maximum total length males , females ; maximum tail length males , females .

Head scalation consists of 10–11(12) upper labials, the first partially or completely fused to the nasal. Head scales small, subequal, feebly imbricate, smooth or weakly keeled. The supraoculars are narrow (occasionally enlarged and undivided) with 8–12 interocular scales between them. Temporal scales smooth.

Midbody has 29 (rarely 19) longitudinal dorsal scale rows. The ventral scales are 155–166 in males, 152–176 in females. The subcaudals are paired, 60–72 in males, 49–66 in females. The hemipenes are without spines.

Color pattern: green above, the side of the head below the eyes is yellow, white or pale green, much lighter than rest of head. The belly is green, yellowish or white below. A light ventrolateral stripe is present in all males, but absent in females. The end of tail is not mottled brown.

Distribution and habitat
Found in Nepal northeastern India (Assam and Jharkhand), Bangladesh, Myanmar, Thailand, Cambodia, Laos, Vietnam, southern China (Fukien, Hainan, Kwangsi, Kwangtung), Hong Kong, Macau, Indonesia (Sumatra, Java, Lombok, Sumbawa, Komodo, Flores, Sumba, Roti, Kisar, Wetar). The type locality given is "China".

Diet
Its meals consist of birds, small frogs, and small mammals. This snake doesn't strike and release its prey; like many arboreal snakes, rather holds on to the prey item until it dies.

Venom
The venom is primarily hemotoxic.
Results of bites from this species range from mild envenoming to death. The venom of white-lipped pitviper contains procoagulant properties. There have been numerous reported bites with few fatalities.

References

Further reading

Das I. 1999. Biogeography of the amphibians and reptiles of the Andaman and Nicobar Islands, India. In: Ota, H. (ed) Tropical Island herpetofauna, Elsevier, pp. 43–77.
David P, Vogel V. 2000. "On the occurrence of Trimeresurus albolabris" (Gray 1842) on Sumatra Island, Indonesia (Reptilia, Serpentes, Viperidae, Crotalinae). Senckenbergiana Biologica 80 (1/2): 225–232.
David P, Vogel G, Dubois A. 2011. "On the need to follow rigorously the Rules of the Code for the subsequent designation of a nucleospecies (type species) for a nominal genus which lacked one: the case of the nominal genus Trimeresurus" Lacépède, 1804 (Reptilia: Squamata: Viperidae). Zootaxa 2992: 1–51.
Einfalt P. 2002. "Haltung und Vermehrung von Trimeresurus albolabris" (Gray 1842). Elaphe 10 (4): 31–36.
Gray, JE. 1842. "Synopsis of the species of Rattle-Snakes, or Family of CROTALIDÆ." The Zoological Miscellany 2: 47–51. (Trimeresurus albolabris, p. 48.)
Gumprecht, A. 2001. "Die Bambusottern der Gattung Trimeresurus Lacépède Teil IV: Checkliste der Trimeresurus-Arten Thailands". Sauria 23 (2): 25–32.
Parkinson CL. 1999. "Molecular systematics and biogeographical history of Pit Vipers as determined by mitochondrial ribosomal DNA sequences". Copeia 1999 (3): 576–586.

External links

albolabris
Snakes of Southeast Asia
Reptiles of Cambodia
Snakes of China
Reptiles of Hong Kong
Reptiles of Indonesia
Reptiles of Malaysia
Reptiles of Myanmar
Reptiles of Thailand
Snakes of Vietnam
Reptiles described in 1842
Taxa named by John Edward Gray